Booza is an Eastern Levant frozen dairy dessert made with milk, cream, sugar, mastic and sahlab (orchid flour), giving it its distinguished stretchy and chewy texture—much like dondurma.

Booza is traditionally made through a process of pounding and stretching in a freezer drum, instead of the more usual churning method used in other ice creams, leading to a creamy yet dense texture.

History
Booza origins dates back to at least 1500 AD in Greater Syria and is sometimes referred to as the "first ice cream in the world".

Ancient Damascus
In Al-Hamidiyah Souq in the Old City of Damascus, there is an ice cream store named Bakdash that is known throughout the Arab world for its stretchy and chewy ice cream. It is a popular attraction for tourists as well.

International usage
A brother and sister team (Jilbert El-Zmetr and Tedy Altree-Williams) pioneered and created the first packaged version of booza in Australia in 2011. Using local ingredients together with sahlab and mastic (from the island of Chios, Greece), they recreated the traditional form of booza and packaged this in a take-home format available to consumers.

In 2018, a booza scoop-shop named Republic of Booza opened in Williamsburg, Brooklyn, US, by Tamer Rabbani and Michael Sadler.

See also
 List of dairy products
 List of ice cream varieties by country

References

Mastic ice creams